Tetralin (1,2,3,4-tetrahydronaphthalene) is a hydrocarbon having the chemical formula C10H12. It is a partially hydrogenated derivative of naphthalene.  It is a colorless liquid that is used as a hydrogen-donor solvent.

Production
Tetralin is produced by the catalytic hydrogenation of naphthalene.

Although nickel catalysts are traditionally employed, many variations have been evaluated. Over-hydrogenation converts tetralin into decahydronaphthalene (decalin).  Rarely encountered is dihydronaphthalene (dialin).

Laboratory methods
In a classic named reaction called the Darzens tetralin synthesis, named for Auguste Georges Darzens (1926), derivatives can be prepared by intramolecular electrophilic aromatic substitution reaction of a 1-aryl-4-pentene using concentrated sulfuric acid,

Uses
Tetralin is used as a hydrogen-donor solvent, for example in coal liquifaction.  It functions as a source of H2, which is transferred to the coal.  The partially hydrogenated coal is more soluble.

It has been used in sodium-cooled fast reactors as a secondary coolant to keep sodium seals around pump impellers solidified; however its use has been superseded by NaK.

It is also used for the laboratory synthesis of HBr:
C10H12  +  4 Br2   →   C10H8Br4  +  4 HBr
The facility of this reaction is in part a consequence of the moderated strength of the benzylic C-H bonds.

Safety
 (rats, oral) is 2.68 g/kg.  Tetralin induces methemoglobinemia.

References

 
Aromatic solvents
Aromatic hydrocarbons